God Shave the Queens is a documentary streaming television series about the tour following each series of RuPaul's Drag Race UK. The show originally premiered internationally on 10 September 2020 on WOW Presents Plus internationally, and BBC iPlayer on 15 November 2020 in the United Kingdom.

Series overview

Series 1 (2020) 
The first series contains eight episodes, and was released through WOW Presents Plus on 10 September 2020 and BBC iPlayer on 15 November 2020. The first series follows the contestants of RuPaul's Drag Race UK series one: Gothy Kendoll, Scaredy Kat, Vinegar Strokes, Crystal, Sum Ting Wong, Blu Hydrangea, Cheryl Hole, Baga Chipz, Divina de Campo, and The Vivienne as well as their choreographer Alyssa Edwards on a six-city tour across the UK.

Series 2 (2022) 
The second series (containing twelve episodes) followed series two of RuPaul's Drag Race UK contestants: Cherry Valentine, Asttina Mandella, Ginny Lemon, Veronica Green, Joe Black, Tia Kofi, Sister Sister, A'Whora, Ellie Diamond, Bimini Bon-Boulash, Tayce and Lawrence Chaney.

References

External links 
 

2020 British television series debuts
2020 web series debuts
British LGBT-related web series
British non-fiction web series
Documentary web series
Drag (clothing) television shows
RuPaul's Drag Race UK
WOW Presents Plus original programming